Hargrave is a village in the civil parish of Hargrave and Huxley (before 2015, Foulk Stapleford), the unitary authority of Cheshire West and Chester, and the ceremonial county of Cheshire, England.

St Peter's Church, Hargrave is a Grade II* listed building.

The Shropshire Union Canal (originally Chester Canal) passes close to the village.

References

Villages in Cheshire
Cheshire West and Chester